Víctor Hugo Cárdenas Conde (born 4 June 1951) is a Bolivian indigenous Aymara activist and politician. He is the leader of the MRTKL party (Revolutionary Liberation Movement Tupaq Katari). He was the 35th vice president of Bolivia from 1993 to 1997 during the first presidency of Gonzalo Sánchez de Lozada.

Cárdenas was born in 1951 in the Aymara village of Achica Bajo on the shores of Lake Titicaca, the son of a rural school teacher. When he was still a child, his father changed his name from Choquehuanca to Cárdenas, in order to mask his indigenous origin and remove what at the time was an obstacle to his educational and professional advancement. His wife has never renounced the typical dress of the chola, an urbanized woman who retains her indigenous identity.

Cardenas holds a PhD in linguistics and is a university professor.

Cárdenas was an unsuccessful candidate in the 2009 Bolivian presidential election, losing to Evo Morales. He claimed that his ticket was seeking a national consensus rather than division. He was appointed Minister of Education in the government of President Jeanine Añez, overseeing school interruptions and the implementation of virtual education during the coronavirus pandemic. He was dismissed on 19 October after being censured by the Legislative Assembly.

References

Bolivian people of Aymara descent
Vice presidents of Bolivia
1951 births
Living people
Revolutionary Liberation Movement Tupaq Katari politicians
People from Ingavi Province
20th-century Bolivian politicians
21st-century Bolivian politicians